Sauvallea is a monotypic genus of monocotyledonous flowering plants in the family Commelinaceae, first described as a genus in 1871. The genus consists of a single species, Sauvallea blainii, which was endemic to Cuba. 

The species is believed to be extinct. 

The genus name of Sauvallea is in honour of Francisco Adolfo Sauvalle (1807–1879), Cuban botanist and expert in molluscs. It is not known what the Latin specific epithet of blainii refers to.

It was first described and published in Anales Acad. Ci. Méd. Habana Vol.7 on page 608 in 1871. Plants of the World Online note that Sauvallea C.Wright, is a synonym of Sauvallia 

It was placed within subtribe Thyrsanthemineae, due to its solitary spathe inclosing a single flower. It also has six, equal, filaments bearded (as part of the stamen) and subequal petals. Specimens exist at the Missouri Dunn-Palmer Herbarium.

References

Commelinaceae
Monotypic Commelinales genera
Flora of Cuba
Extinct plants
Plants described in 1871